Richard "Dickie"/"Dicky" Evison Lockwood (11 November 1867 – 10 November 1915) was a rugby union, and professional rugby league footballer who played in the 1880s, 1890s and 1900s. He played representative level rugby union (RU) for England from 1887 to 1894, and was captain in January and February 1894, and Yorkshire, and at club level for Dewsbury and Heckmondwike, as a Three-quarter, and club level rugby league (RL) for Wakefield Trinity (Heritage No. 33), as a Forward, e.g. front row, back row, or lock. Prior to 3 September 1898, Dewsbury was a rugby union club, and prior to the 1896–97 Northern Rugby Football Union season, Heckmondwike was also a rugby union club.

Background
Dicky Lockwood was born in Crigglestone, Wakefield, West Riding of Yorkshire, England, and he died aged 47 in Leeds, West Riding of Yorkshire, England.

Biography
Dicky Lockwood was born on 11 November 1867 in Crigglestone. Dicky Lockwood's marriage was registered during first ¼ 1889 in Dewsbury district. Dicky Lockwood was the landlord of The Queen Hotel, Westgate, Heckmondwike.

Rugby union
Lockwood made his international début on Saturday 8 January 1887 in Llanelli against Wales in the 1887 Home Nations Championship. The match was to have been held at Stradey Park, which would have been that ground's first international rugby union match. The game was arranged for 8 January and a temporary stand was erected to allow a seating area so the club could charge higher ticket prices; but on the day the English team refused to play on the ground as the pitch was frozen. The adjacent cricket ground was in better condition, so the match was moved there along with the entire crowd, many members of which were extremely unhappy as they lost their seating area. Of the 14 matches he played for his national side he was on the winning side on 8 occasions.
He played his last match for England on Saturday 3 February 1894 at Rectory Field, Blackheath in the England vs Ireland match.

Rugby league
When Heckmondwike converted from the rugby union code to the rugby league code for the 1896–97 Northern Rugby Football Union season, Dicky Lockwood had already transferred from Heckmondwike to Wakefield Trinity the previous season, consequently, he only ever played rugby union for Heckmondwike, he played rugby league for Wakefield Trinity at centre from October 1895 finishing in the 1900–01 season, having scored 31-tries, and 60-goals, scoring 222-points for Wakefield Trinity.

Drop-goals (field-goals)
Lockwood appears to have scored no drop-goals (or field-goals as they are currently known in Australasia), but prior to the 1974–75 season all goals, whether; conversions, penalties, or drop-goals, scored 2-points, consequently prior to this date drop-goals were often not explicitly documented, therefore '0' drop-goals may indicate drop-goals not recorded, rather than no drop-goals scored. In addition, prior to the 1949–50 season, the archaic field-goal was also still a valid means of scoring points.

References

External links
Biography of Arthur Budd with an England team photograph including Richard Lockwood
Search for "Lockwood" at rugbyleagueproject.org
 (archived by web.archive.org) Legends: Richard 'Dicky' Lockwood

1867 births
1915 deaths
19th-century British businesspeople
British rugby league administrators
Dewsbury Rams players
England international rugby union players
English rugby league players
English rugby union players
Heckmondwike RFC players
People from Crigglestone
Publicans
Rugby league hookers
Rugby league locks
Rugby league players from Wakefield
Rugby league props
Rugby league second-rows
Rugby union players from Wakefield
Rugby union three-quarters
Wakefield Trinity players
Yorkshire County RFU players